If I Kill This Thing We're All Going to Eat for a Week is the debut studio album by Foo Fighters bassist Nate Mendel under his project Lieutenant. It was released March 2015 under Dine Alone Records.

Track listing
All tracks composed by Nate Mendel

References

2015 debut albums
Dine Alone Records albums